Redbone is an American rock band founded in 1969 by brothers Pat and Lolly Vegas. All band members during their commercial peak were of Mexican American and Native American heritage, which was reflected in their songs, stage costumes, and album art.

They reached the Top 5 on the U.S. Billboard Hot 100 chart in 1974 with their single, "Come and Get Your Love". The single went certified Gold selling over a million copies. It also made Redbone the first Native American band to reach the top five on the Billboard Hot 100, with the song reaching number 5. Redbone achieved hits with their singles "We Were All Wounded at Wounded Knee", "The Witch Queen of New Orleans", "Wovoka", and "Maggie" in the United States, although these singles were more successful overseas.

Pat has been the sole original member of the band since Lolly's death in 2010.

History
Born in Coalinga, California, near Fresno, brothers Patrick (bass and vocals) and Candido "Lolly" Vasquez-Vegas (guitar and vocals) moved to Los Angeles in 1959 and played for ten years in clubs under the name of Pat and Lolly Vegas. Pat won Coca-Cola's first singing competition in 1958 at age 17. He also won a recording contract, which he put off to move to Los Angeles with Lolly. They performed at local clubs on Hollywood and Sunset Boulevard (such as Gazzari's) while writing and playing on records by Tina Turner, Sonny & Cher, James Brown, Little Richard, and Elvis, among other legendary artists.

The word "redbone" is a Cajun term for a mixed-race person, which the band adopted to signify their mixed ancestry. The Vasquez-Vegas brothers were of Yaqui, Shoshone, and Mexican heritage. The band often alluded to Cajun and New Orleans culture in their lyrics and performing style. The brothers began by performing and recording surf music as the Vegas Brothers, "because their agent told them that the world was not yet ready to embrace a duo of Mexican musicians playing surfing music". First as the Vegas Brothers, then later as the Crazy Cajun Cakewalk Band, Pat and Lolly performed throughout the 1960s at venues on the Sunset Strip.

Before forming Redbone, Pat and Lolly released an album in October 1965 entitled Pat & Lolly Vegas at the Haunted House (Mercury MG 21059/SR 61059). Of the twelve songs on the album, six were originals by the Vasquez-Vegas brothers which earned them some early success. Pat and Lolly also appeared on the '60s hit show Shindig! repeatedly, becoming regular performers. They also released several singles from 1961 to the mid-1960s, one titled "Robot Walk" / "Don't You Remember" (Apogee Records A-101), helping to make a name for themselves in their early years.

In 1967, P.J. Proby recorded his only Top-30 hit, "Niki Hoeky", written by Jim Ford, Lolly Vegas, and Pat Vegas. The next year, Bobbie Gentry performed the Cajun-influenced song on The Smothers Brothers Comedy Hour and included it on her smash-hit album, Ode to Billie Joe. Pat Vegas also wrote songs for legendary names like Aretha Franklin amongst others.

According to Pat Vegas, Jimi Hendrix, himself part Cherokee, inspired the musicians to form an all-Native American rock group. (Hendrix himself stated that Lolly Vegas was his favorite guitarist and biggest influence in music). They signed as the band 'Redbone' to Epic Records in 1969. The band then consisted of Pat Vegas, Lolly Vegas, Peter DePoe and Robert Anthony Avila, a Yaqui-Mexican American, better known by his stage name Tony Bellamy. Their debut album Redbone was released in 1970.

Redbone played primarily rock music with R&B, Cajun, blue-eyed soul, funk, country, tribal, and Latin roots. Their first world commercial success came with the single "The Witch Queen of New Orleans" (from Message from a Drum) that peaked at No. 21 on the Billboard Hot 100, and followed by the single "Maggie" from their second album, Potlatch. "Come and Get Your Love" followed as a big No. 5 hit for Redbone and remained on the chart for 24 weeks being certified gold by the R.I.A.A. on April 22, 1974. Redbone was also the opening act introducing the first Earth Day to the world in Philadelphia along with Senator Edmund Muskie. Their opening song was "Chant 13th Hour" from the Potlatch album.

Redbone's music was characterized by the Leslie rotating speaker effect that Lolly Vegas used for his electric guitar amplifier and a "King Kong" style of drumming developed by drummer Peter DePoe. This Leslie effect was developed while rehearsing at Dress Revue Sound Studios in Hollywood, California in the early 1970s.

The first self-titled album by Redbone was released as a double album in North America. In Europe, it was released both as a double (EPC 67242) and as a single album (BN 26280) on the Epic label.

Their third album, Message from a Drum, was released in Europe (except Spain) with the title The Witch Queen of New Orleans and a different cover than the one released in the U.S. and Canada.

In 1973, Redbone released the politically oriented "We Were All Wounded at Wounded Knee", recalling the massacre of Lakota Sioux Indians by the 7th Cavalry Regiment in 1890. The song ends with the subtly altered sentence "We were all wounded 'by' Wounded Knee". It charted in several European countries and reached the No. 1 position in The Netherlands but did not chart in the U.S. where it was initially withheld from release due to lyrical controversy and then banned by several radio stations due to its confrontation of a sore subject. DePoe had left this band in 1972. He was replaced by Arturo Perez (1939- ), but later by Bellamy's Filipino-Chicano cousin, Butch Rillera around that point. Following this the band achieved much of their commercial success. Tony Bellamy (guitar, piano and vocals) left the band in 1977, with Rillera leaving shortly after.

The band's current remaining membership is led by Pat Vegas, although an array of new members have joined Redbone since then due to Lolly Vegas suffering a stroke that left him unable to tour with the band. No member has been official other than Pat Vegas after the original members were not present. A proposed reunion tour in 2003 did not occur. There is evidence that suggests the existence of an "imposter band" (one of many who try to gain recognition) who was illegally touring the United States and posing as Redbone under the name (or alias) "Denny Freeman". Freeman - who Pat Vegas confirmed to be unaffiliated with Redbone in an interview with the Montana Standard - defrauded the county fair board of the Butte Silver-Bow County Fair in Butte, Montana, under pretenses of being a co-founding member of Redbone, yet he was never a band member.

On December 25, 2009, Tony Bellamy died of liver failure at a hospital in his hometown of Las Vegas, at age 63. Less than three months later, Lolly Vegas died of lung cancer at his family home in Reseda, California, on March 4, 2010, at age 70.

Redbone headlined the Inaugural Indigenous Peoples Day event along with Pat Vegas's son PJ Vegas, daughter Frankie Vegas, and The Black Eyed Peas at Los Angeles City Hall on October 8, 2018, Grand Park. This was the first indigenous celebration commemorating this change that took two years to complete. Spearheaded by LA Council member Mitch O'Farrell, they honored the largest native community in the United States, Los Angeles, and the native people who first inhabited LA, the Tongva people.

Pat Vegas continues to tour in the United States and Canada in support of his solo albums, Ambergris, Peacepipe, Speed of Sound, and "Buffalo Bluz". He also is part of a touring version of Redbone that plays both his solo efforts and the hits from the band's heyday.

Musical style and influences

Redbone's music was primarily rock music, but incorporated elements of rock and roll, funk, folk music, blues, swamp funk, Tex-Mex, rhythm and blues, indigenous music of North America, soul music, soft rock, hard rock, Cajun music, jazz and Latin music. The band's style was classified as swamp rock.

Awards and accolades
Redbone was inducted into the Native American Music Association Hall of Fame in 2008, as well as the legendary NY Smithsonian in 2013. They were also honored with vein painted on the largest mural in the U.S. in Fresno, California. On August 30, 2014, Pat Vegas was honored with the Lifetime Achievement "Legend" Award from the "West Coast American Indian Music Awards."

In 2014, "Come and Get Your Love" experienced a resurgence in popularity when it was featured in the Marvel Studios film Guardians of the Galaxy as one of the songs on a mixtape made for the protagonist, Peter Quill. It was also included on the film's soundtrack album, which reached the top spot on the Billboard 200 chart.

In 2015, "Come and Get Your Love" was used as the intro theme to Netflix produced cartoon series F is for Family.

In 2018, in France, "Come and Get Your Love" was featured in a Bouygues Telecom television commercial showing three successive generations appreciating the song.

In 2018, Pat Vegas was awarded with the "Lifetime Achievement Award" from the Indigenous Music Awards.

In 2021, "Come and Get Your Love" was featured in episode 5 of the FX show, Reservation Dogs.

Members
Pat Vasquez-Vegas – bass, vocals (1969–1977, 1997–present)
Former members
Lolly Vasquez-Vegas – guitars, vocals (1969–1977, 1997–2010; his death)
Tony Bellamy – guitars, vocals (1969–1977, 1997–1998, 2008; died 2009)
Peter DePoe – drums, percussion, backing vocals (1969–1972)
Arturo Perez – drums, recorded on their album Already Here (1972) 
Butch Rillera – drums, percussion, backing vocals (1973–1977)
Aloisio Aguilar – guitar and keyboards, joined the band on their album Cycles (1977)
Thunderhand Joe – drums (1981–1998)

Discography

Studio albums
Redbone (1970)
Potlatch (1970)
Message from a Drum (1971)
Already Here (1972)
Wovoka (1973)
Beaded Dreams Through Turquoise Eyes (1974)
Cycles (1977)
Peace Pipe (2005)

Notes

References

Further reading

External links

MySpace - Redbone (Unofficial Redbone website)
Cajun Funk with a Touch of Latin Soul. - Redbone history on Mark Guerrero's site

Selected video clips

Epic Records artists
Musical groups established in 1969
Musical groups from Los Angeles
Native American musical groups
Rock music groups from California
Swamp rock groups